Guy Joseph Livingston Hamilton (4 July 1923 – 21 December 2010) was a medical doctor and mental health services advocate  in Western Australia.

Hamilton was born into a family of doctors in the United Kingdom. He became a medical practitioner, and his youngest son was born deaf and with cerebral palsy. In 1956 he contracted polio after applying for a position at the Spastic Centre in Perth. He migrated to Perth the following year and spent four years at the Centre. In 1961 he joined the government's mental health services department and became a doctor at Claremont Mental Hospital. From 1964 to 1982 he was head of the former Mental Deficiency Division. He resolved to change the low priority mental health had in treatment and care, and was successful in transferring Claremont child patients into the community. He began a course for social trainers, was a founding member of the Australian Group for the Scientific Study of Mental Deficiency, and was involved in the purchase of Tresillian Hospital in Nedlands.

References

1923 births
2010 deaths
British expatriates in Australia
British expatriates in the United States